Leo Andanar Lastimosa (born September 26, 1964) is a veteran tri-media journalist in Cebu City, Philippines.
He is a former anchorman for ABS-CBN's regional news program, TV Patrol Central Visayas, the host of current affairs program Arangkada over radio station DYAB, and a columnist in Cebu's newspaper The Freeman.

Early life 
Lastimosa was a son of a farmer and a public school teacher. Growing up in Talisay in poverty, he dreamed of becoming a writer. In high school, he submitted an unsolicited article to the publisher of The Freeman, a Cebu local daily. His submission was published the next day, an event that encouraged him to pursue a journalistic career. He then took up a degree in political science at the University of San Jose-Recoletos.

Career 
His first stint in professional journalism started in 1985 at DYLA radio station. He later moved to another radio station, DYRF. At the height of first EDSA revolution, he was involved in the radio's newsroom work. In 1995, he became a news director in the newly-launched radio station, DYAB, and started hosting the regular television program, Banat Visayas, Sulong Mindanao. He claimed he had received death threats in the course of his journalistic career.

Later, he became an anchor for the TV Patrol Central Visayas in 2003 by ABS-CBN 3 Cebu. He had also started a column, Arangkada, written in Cebuano language in The Freeman, a local daily newspaper.

Decriminalizing libel 
In 2007, then Cebu Governor Gwendolyn Garcia filed a libel case against Lastimosa. The suit alleged that Garcia was the subject of his column entitled Doling Kawatan (Doling the Thief) that was published on The Freeman last June 29, 2007. On August 27, 2010, Regional Trial Court Branch 14 Judge Raphael Yrastorza signed a warrant of arrest against Lastimosa, who then posted bail. Lastimosa denied that Garcia was the subject of the article. On August 30, 2013, the court found Lastimosa guilty, and fined him Php 6,000 and an additional Php 2 million for moral damages. He lost his appeal as the Court of Appeals upheld the lower court's decision. Attorney Celso Espinosa, his counsel, filed a motion for reconsideration to reverse the ruling of the appellate court.

His conviction, as well as other similar high-level cases filed against journalists in the country, prompted renewed calls to decriminalize libel in defense of press freedom.

CIDG subpoena 
On August 17, 2018, Lastimosa appeared in the regional office of Criminal Investigation and Detection Group (CIDG) - Central Visayas in response to a subpoena that directed him to provide a copy of his interview with Senator Antonio Trillanes on his radio show last September 8, 2017. The subpoena came after former Davao City vice mayor Paolo Duterte, son of President Rodrigo Duterte, requested the police to obtain a copy of the interview as evidence in court for a libel case he was filing against Trillanes who accused him for being involved in Php 6.2 billion shabu shipment in 2016.
Lastimosa executed an affidavit stating that audio recordings were long deleted as radio stations were only mandated to keep the records for 10 days or 30 days when there is a court order. He also declined to authenticate a recording of the said interview presented by the CIDG.

Give Up Tomorrow 
Lastimosa also appeared in the documentary Give Up Tomorrow alongside other journalists who were interviewed regarding the controversial conviction of Paco Laranaga, one of the suspects of the murder of the Chiong sisters in the 1990s.

Personal life 
Aside from journalism, he also ventured into music. He penned the lyrics of Awit ni Dodong, the winning entry of the theme song contest for the Jose “Dodong” R. Gullas (JRG) Halad Museum. About a lover's hopes and fears for a beloved, the song was put into music by Emilio Villareal.

Awards
Lastimosa has won numerous awards and recognition for his work. Notably, the Talisay City Council passed a resolution congratulating him for his win at 2005 KBP Golden Dove Awards citing his "commendable competence, integrity and fairness in the field of newscasting and showed his dedication and deep love for his country and people by his humble service as a media man."
 Best TV Newscaster, The 14th Golden Dove Awards of the Kapisanan ng mga Brodkaster ng Pilipinas (KBP)
 Garbo Sa Sugbo, by the Cebu Provincial Government in the field of broadcast journalism and television 
 Best TV News Program, TV Patrol Central Visayas, 16th Cebu Archdiocesan Mass Media Awards, 2013
 Outstanding Talisaynon, by the Talisay City Government in the field of media.
 Hall of Fame, Radio News Category, Cebu Archdiocesan Mass Media Awards (CAMMA)
 Hall of Fame, Radio Commentary Category, Cebu Archdiocesan Mass Media Awards (CAMMA)
 Finalist, Column Writing Category, Cebu Archdiocesan Mass Media Awards (CAMMA)
 Special Citation, Kasayurang Kinuykoyan, National Press Club (NPC), 1991
 Best Public Affairs Program (Arangkada), KBP Golden Dove Awards, 1998
 Best Public Affairs Program Host, KBP Golden Dove Awards, 2002
 Best Commentary Program (Kuwentas Klaras), KBP Golden Dove Awards, 2002
 Best TV News Program, Catholic Mass Media Awards (CMMA-Manila), 2005

See also 
 TV Patrol Central Visayas
 DYAB
 The Freeman

References

External links
 Profile on Google Docs
 Profile on Scribd

1964 births
Living people
People from Leyte (province)
People from Cebu City
Filipino television news anchors
Filipino radio journalists
ABS-CBN News and Current Affairs people
University of San Jose–Recoletos alumni